Laurence Wild (May 1, 1890 – May 26, 1971) was a United States Navy Captain, college basketball player and coach, and the governor of American Samoa from August 8, 1940 to June 5, 1942. Wild was born in Wilber, Nebraska, and lived in the 4th Congressional District of Nebraska for much of his adult life. He graduated from the United States Naval Academy in 1913; while there he played for the Navy Midshipmen basketball team, and was named a 1913 NCAA Basketball All-American.  He returned as head coach of the team for one year (1913–14), coaching for ten games and winning all of them.

While a Lieutenant Commander, Wild served as a communications officer for Submarine Squadron 11. President of the United States Franklin Roosevelt recommended Wild for the rank of captain in 1939.

During his governorship, a more complicated political structure arose in American Samoa when Brigadier General Henry Louis Larsen of the United States Marine Corps became Military Governor and Island Commander of Tutuila. Though Larsen outranked him and commanded the military on the island, Wild held the senior position, and ultimately maintained control over the administration of all the islands in American Samoa. On March 13, 1941, Wild ordered the construction of an airfield on the main island. He died in Coronado, California on May 26, 1971.

References

1890 births
1971 deaths
All-American college men's basketball players
American men's basketball coaches
Basketball coaches from Nebraska
Basketball players from Nebraska
Governors of American Samoa
Navy Midshipmen men's basketball coaches
Navy Midshipmen men's basketball players
People from Wilber, Nebraska
United States Navy officers
American men's basketball players